The Ashorne Hall Railway was a ridable miniature railway in Warwickshire, England.  It was conceived as an added attraction to the collection of mechanical musical instruments at the Ashorne Hall museum.  It was completed in the mid-1990s and was called the Nickelodeon Line.

With two substantial stations, a tunnel and engine shed it was very well equipped. With the death of its creator Graham Whitehead in 2003, the railway closed. It was dismantled and sold in 2005 and the track lifted. The steam locomotive is now at the Rudyard Lake Steam Railway and the petrol locomotive and carriages at the Wilderness Railway.

Equipment 
Locomotives
2-4-2T Ashorne, built 1994 by Exmoor Steam Railway
2-4-2 Bella, built locally on chassis supplied by Exmoor Steam Railway using a Coventry Climax petrol engine.

Rolling stock
5 bogie carriages built locally by Paul Camps on frames supplied by Exmoor Steam Railway
2 tip wagons

References 

 Heywood Society Journal No.36 Spring 1995

External links 
History and pictures of the Ashorne Hall Railway
Pictures of the Ashorne Hall Railway

Ashorne Hall Railway
12¼ in gauge railways in England